Midnight Lover or Midnite Lover may refer to:

Film
"Midnight Lover", animated short from Crime Time
Midnight Lovers (1926 film), an American silent romantic war comedy
Midnight Lovers, a 1975 Italian film also known as The Immortal Bachelor

Music

Albums
Midnight Lover (The Square album), 1978
Midnite Lover, album and song by Shaggy, 1997

Songs
"Midnight Lover", song by Joe Dolan, 1977
"Midnight Lover", song by Leon Russell from his 1978 album Americana
"Midnight Lover", song by Koreana, 1983
"Midnight Lover", song by Pete Townshend from Live: Brixton Academy '85
"Midnight Lover", first single of People Like Us
"Midnight Lover", song by Wiley with A-List, 2010  
"Midnight Lover", song by Side Effect from Portraits
"Midnight Lover", song by Samantha Fox, 2008
"Midnight Lover" Gussie Clarke, Freddie McGregor 1991

See also
 Midnight Love (disambiguation)